Caroline Jorge Magalhães (born 29 November 2005) is a Luxembourger footballer who plays as a midfielder for Standard Liège and the Luxembourg women's national team.

International career
Jorge made her senior debut for Luxembourg on 11 April 2021 during a 2–1 friendly win against Liechtenstein.

International goals

References

2005 births
Living people
Women's association football midfielders
Luxembourgian women's footballers
Luxembourg women's international footballers
Luxembourgian people of Portuguese descent